Integral theory may refer to:

 Integral theory (Ken Wilber), an attempt to place a wide diversity of theories and thinkers into one single framework
 Integral theory (Ervin László) or Akashic field theory, a theory of information and systems

See also 
 A Theory of Everything, 2000 book by Ken Wilber detailing his theory
 Integral yoga, yoga-based philosophy and practice of Sri Aurobindo
 California Institute of Integral Studies, a university in San Francisco, California
 Integral (disambiguation)
 Theory of everything (disambiguation)

Integral thought